The Green Monocle (German: Das grüne Monokel) is a 1929 German silent crime film directed by Rudolf Meinert and starring Ralph Clancy, Betty Bird and Suzy Vernon. The film was based on a novel by Guido Kreutzer. It features the fictional detective Stuart Webbs, one of several German fictional characters inspired by Sherlock Holmes, who had appeared in a series of silent films during the 1910s and 1920s.

It was shot at the Tempelhof Studios in Berlin with location shooting in Berlin, Hamburg, Frankfurt am Main as well as Basel and Montreux in Switzerland. The film's sets were designed by the art directors Robert Neppach and Erwin Scharf

Cast
 Ralph Clancy as Stuart Webbs 
 Betty Bird as Christa Varell 
 Suzy Vernon as Inez Rion 
 Gaston Modot as McCornick 
 Livio Pavanelli as Miller 
 Paul Hörbiger as Snyder 
 Alfred Döderlein as Hans von Traß 
 Ferdinand Hart as Bruce 
 Arnold Korff as Dr. Heinzius

References

Bibliography
 Prawer, S.S. Between Two Worlds: The Jewish Presence in German and Austrian Film, 1910-1933. Berghahn Books, 2007.

External links

1929 films
Films of the Weimar Republic
German crime films
German silent feature films
Films directed by Rudolf Meinert
Films based on German novels
1929 crime films
German black-and-white films
Films shot at Tempelhof Studios
1920s German films
1920s German-language films
Silent crime films